Reimerswaal is a municipality in the province of Zeeland in the southwestern Netherlands on Zuid-Beveland, named after the lost city. The central town Yerseke is known for trade in mussels and oysters. Kruiningen is known for the former ferry from Kruiningen to Perkpolder which was in service up to 2003. The municipality of Reimerswaal was established in 1970, from the aggregation of the municipalities Krabbendijke, Kruiningen, Rilland-Bath, Waarde, and Yerseke.

The municipal coat of arms(nl) dates to 1970. The sword in a red field is derived from the coat of arms of the lost city of Reimerswaal in use in the 15th century (Beyeren Armorial p. 107) of gules two swords inverted saltirewise argent and or. In addition, the municipal coat of arms shows the comital arms of Wittelsbach-Hainaut in chief.

Population centers

Topography

Dutch Topographic map of the municipality of Reimerswaal, June 2015

Transportation 
The Railway stations from west to east are Kruiningen-Yerseke, Krabbendijke, Rilland-Bath, which all on the Staatslijn F railway from Vlissingen to Roosendaal.

Notable people 
 Marinus van Reymerswaele (c.1490 Reimerswaal – c.1546) a Dutch Renaissance painter 
 Daan Manneke (born 1939 in Kruiningen) a Dutch composer and organist
 Maartje Boudeling (born 1939 in Yerseke) a retired head chef
 F. van Dixhoorn (born 1948 in Hansweert) a Dutch poet.
 Johnny Hoogerland (born 1983 in Yerseke) a former Dutch professional cyclist

Gallery

References

External links

Official website (in Dutch)

 
Municipalities of Zeeland
Zuid-Beveland